BBC One Wales is a Welsh television channel owned and operated by BBC Cymru Wales. It is the Welsh variation of the UK-wide BBC One and is broadcast from Central Square in Cardiff. BBC One Wales broadcasts around three hours of non-news programmes for Wales each week alongside six hours a week of national news for Wales from Wales Today.

BBC One Wales branding is utilised between 6am and around 1am each day with live continuity handled by a team of national announcer/directors.

A high-definition simulcast of BBC One Wales launched on 29 January 2013 on Freeview, Freesat, Sky and Virgin Media. On 10 December 2013, BBC One Wales HD was swapped with the SD channel on Sky's EPG for HD subscribers.

History
The channel was launched on February 9, 1964 as BBC Cymru Wales.

Programming

References

External links

1964 establishments in Wales
BBC television channels in the United Kingdom
English-language television stations in the United Kingdom
Television channels and stations established in 1964
Television channels in Wales
BBC Cymru Wales